Barry Ashworth may refer to:
 Barry Ashworth (footballer) (born 1942), English footballer
 Barry Ashworth (rugby union) (born 1949), New Zealand rugby union player